Pat Hawkins is the name of

 Pat Hawkins (cyclist) (1921–1991), Australian endurance cyclist 
 Pat Hawkins (hurdler) (born 1950), American hurdler and sprinter